The Melbourne International Gateway, colloquially known as The Cheese Stick or Cheesestick, is a giant yellow sculptural work and iconic roadside attraction over the CityLink motorway in the suburb of Parkville of Melbourne, the state capital of Victoria, Australia.

The artwork was designed by international architecture firm Denton Corker Marshall and opened in the year 2000, is now considered an iconic landmark. It is situated on the CityLink tollway, the major connection between Melbourne Airport and the Central Business District.

The Cheese Stick is a yellow steel beam approximately 70 metres in length and it is accompanied by 39 smaller red beams. It was inspired by the Victorian gold rush in the 1850s, whilst the red beams of the art installation are to represent the wheat industry in the state.

References 

Outdoor sculptures in Australia
Buildings and structures in the City of Melbourne (LGA)
Steel sculptures in Australia
2000 sculptures
Flemington, Victoria
2000 establishments in Australia
Articles containing video clips